John Fleet may refer to:

John Faithfull Fleet (1847–1917), historian, epigraphist and linguist
Sir John Fleet (Lord Mayor) (1648–1712), Member of Parliament and Sheriff for London
John Fleet (MP), Member of Parliament for Weymouth and Melcombe Regis (UK Parliament constituency) in 1397